Critical transitions are abrupt shifts in the state of ecosystems, the climate, financial systems or other complex dynamical systems that may occur when changing conditions pass a critical or bifurcation point. As such, they are a particular type of regime shift. Recovery from such shifts may require more than a simple return to the conditions at which a transition occurred, a phenomenon called hysteresis.

Early-warning signals and critical slowing down

Significant efforts have been made to identify early-warning signals of critical transitions. Systems approaching a bifurcation point show a characteristic behaviour called critical slowing down leading to an increasingly slow recovery from perturbations. This, in turn, may lead to an increase in (spatial or temporal) autocorrelation and variance, while variance spectra tend to lower frequencies, and the 'direction of critical slowing down' in a system's state space may be indicative of a system's future state when delayed negative feedbacks leading to oscillatory or other complex dynamics are weak. Researchers have explored early-warning signals in lakes, climate dynamics, the Amazon rainforest, forests worldwide, food webs, dry-land transitions and epilepsy attacks.

Studies show that more than three-quarters of Amazon rainforest has been losing resilience since the early 2000s as measured by CSD and that tropical, arid and temperate forests are substantially losing resilience. It has been proposed that a loss of resilience in forests "can be detected from the increased temporal autocorrelation (TAC) in the state of the system, reflecting a decline in recovery rates due to the critical slowing down (CSD) of system processes that occur at thresholds".

See also 

 Tipping points in the climate system
 Deforestation and climate change
 Ecological resilience
 Ecological threshold
 Ecosystem collapse
 Cascade effect (ecology)
 Percolation theory

References

External links 

 
 

Systems theory